Kubeck or Kübeck is a surname. Notable people with the surname include:

Candi Kubeck (1961–1996), American airline pilot 
Detlef Kübeck (born 1956), East German sprinter

German-language surnames